"Vista" is the debut single by South Korean girl group Fiestar. The single was released on August 31, 2012 by LOEN Entertainment.

History 
LOEN Entertainment confirmed that they will be releasing a six-member girl group coming from various countries. It is confirmed later when they released teasers of Yezi and Cheska's raps, along with the dance cover of SHINee's Lucifer by the group.

Before the group's debut, they released a collaborative song with IU entitled "Sea of Moonlight". The song charted high on charts, making number 1 at Bugs, Soribada, and Naver; Number 2 at Mnet and Olleh; and number 5 at Melon. They confirmed that the group's name will be Fiestar, a combination of Fiesta + Star. They released the music video on July 26, 2012.

One week before their debut, Fiestar collaborates with Tiger JK to release "Wicked", a song influenced by electronic house music and reggaeton combined. The song also charted at number 57 at Gaon and number 71 at Billboard, showing their popularity before their debut. The song is released digitally on August 23, 2012.

Music video 
The music video starts in a supernatural world, with superheroes living in this world. Yezi is shown having the ability to teleport, Cao Lu has super speed, and Linzy has the ability to fly. Hyemi watches a commercial by JYJ's Junsu for a product called Super Spray. Meanwhile, in the same room, Cheska is seen testing her jetpack (which fails), and writes calculations and formulas on a board. Jei goes to Vista, an audition show, and is shown seating with Sunny Hill's Seungah reprising her role as Wonder Woman. The song now begins, showing various auditions, and the other members arrive to help Jei. It is also revealed that JYJ's Junsu is Superman. After the audition, Fiestar wins the show, continuing their popularity. Cheska flies to the screen, and appears again on the dance scene where their group name is written in the background. After the song finishes, the girls vanish from the screen.

There are two dance settings featured in the video. The first one is an attic with their group's name as the background, and the second one is the stage of Vista's auditioning show.

Release 
The song was originally first performed by the group in Music Core on September 1, 2012 and then to Inkigayo on September 2, 2012. The album became a hit, and entering the Billboard's Hot 100, peaking at number 27, and also their other songs, Wicked at number 71, and Sea of Moonlight entering the Hot 10, with its peak at number 10. They ended their promotions at Inkigayo on October 14, 2012.

Track listing

Chart performance

Singles chart

Albums chart

Sales and Certifications

References

External links 
 "Sea of Moonlight" Music Video (with IU)
 "Vista" Music Video

2012 debut singles
Dance-pop songs
South Korean songs
Korean-language songs
2012 songs